"My Blue Heaven" may refer to:

My Blue Heaven (1950 film), starring Betty Grable
My Blue Heaven (1990 American film), starring Steve Martin
My Blue Heaven (1990 Dutch film)
My Blue Heaven (album), a 1990 album by John Pizzarelli
"My Blue Heaven" (song), a 1927 song covered by many artists
"My Blue Heaven", a 2005 song by Taking Back Sunday from Louder Now